Banja Lučica (Cyrillic: Бања Лучица) is a village in the municipality of Sokolac, Bosnia and Herzegovina.

References

Populated places in Sokolac